Diler & Associados is an independent film production company  specializing in all aspects of film production, from initial script development all the way through to final distribution. D&A’s main goal is to provide content of an international standard, mainstream appeal and with franchise potential.

For more than 20 years in the market, D&A has accumulated a total of 36 films produced and more than 30 million viewers, as well as 1.5 million of videos and DVDs sold. He has also developed partnerships with Buena Vista International, Miravista, Warner Bros., TriStar Pictures, Twentieth Century Fox, Estação Group, California, Globo Filmes, SBT movies, Xuxa Produções, R.A. Productions, Maurício de Sousa Produções, Nhock Produções Artistic, and Rossat Beijing Film & TV Production.

In 2003, after breaking Brazil’s production record by carrying through 5 feature films in a single year, Diler Trindade, the company’s majority shareholder, was chosen by Variety as one of the Top Ten Producer’s to Watch.

In 2003, Diler & Associados produced the feature films Didi, the bumbling cupid, Dom, Mary – Mother of the Son of God, Xuxa Abracadabra and a summer Show, reaching a total of five productions in the period of 12 months and beating a record in the national cinema. Of the films cited, the epic Mary – Mother of the Son of God, with Father Marcelo Rossi, and the fantastic adventure Xuxa Abracadabra sold more than 2 million tickets and became the most viewed national feature films of that year. In the same period, the prestigious American film magazine, Variety, published a story in which Diler Trindade, the majority partner of D&A, WAS one of the most promising producers in the Cinematographic world.

In 2004, D&A was appointed by the National Agency for Cinema in Brazil (ANCINE) as the biggest local producer in recent years, attracting more than 30 million moviegoers and selling more than 1.5 million copies in DVD and VHS formats. Amongst the 35 feature films produced, 11 out of 30 are the biggest box office hits released in the last ten years.

The company began producing films at the end of the decade of 80, through the associated DreamVision, which launched in the market great successes such as Super Xuxa Contra Low Astral (1988), by Anna Penido; Crystal Moon (1990), directed by Tizuka Yamasaki and to this day one of the largest Brazilian cinema box office (approximately 5 million viewers); Xuxa and the Trapalhões in the mystery of Robin Hood (1990), by director José Alvarenga Júnior; Summer Dream (1990), by Paulo Sérgio de Almeida; Inspector Faustão and Mallandro (1991), by Mário Márcio Bandarra; and Gaúcho Negro (1991), directed by Jessel Buss. Diler & Associados returned to production in 1999 after the resumption of national cinema. This year was released Xuxa Requebra, by Tizuka Yamasaki, who started a long list of films: Xuxa Popstar (2000), also of Tizuka Yamasaki and directed by Paulo Sérgio de Almeida; Xuxa and the Elves (2001) and Xuxa and the Elves 2-on the way of the Fairies (2002), both of Paulo Sérgio de Almeida and Rogério Gomes; Didi, the bumbling Cupid (2003), by Paulo Aragão and Alexandre Boury; Dom (2003), inspired by the work of Machado de Assis, Mary – Mother of the Son of God, with Father Marcelo Rossi, a summer Show (2003) and Xuxa Abracadabra (2003), all directed by Moacyr Góes; Didi wants to be a child (2004), directed by Fernando Boury and Alexandre Boury; Xuxa and the treasure of the Lost City (2004), by Moacyr Góes; Brothers of Faith (2004), with Father Marcelo Rossi and directed by Moacyr Góes; The Comedy Woman Thing (2005), by Eliana Fonseca; Didi, The Treasure Hunter (2005), by Marcus Figueiredo; The Machine (2006), by João Falcão, winner of several awards; The animation Xuxinha and Guto against the Monsters of Space (2005); The Knight Didi and Princess Lili (2006), by Marcus Figueiredo; Stay With Me Tonight (2006), directed by João Falcão and inspired by the play by Flávio de Souza; The comedy betray and scratching is only begin (2006), with direction of Moacyr Góes and adapted from the famous piece of Marcos Caruso; Xuxa Twins (2006), by Jorge Fernando; The animation Monica's class in an adventure in Time (2007), based on the comics of Maurício de Sousa; And the Warrior Didi and the Ninja Lili (2008), directed by Marcus Figueiredo, and a werewolf in the Amazon (2008), directed by Ivan Cardoso; Destination (2009), directed by Moacyr Góes;

In 2007, ANCINE released a new database, this time with the Brazilian blockbusters - films that attracted more than 1 million moviegoers in recent years. Diler appears, again, as the top of the list with 9 feature films and 18 million tickets sold between 1999 and 2006.

In 2008, the company received by ONEP, the National organization responsible for events and research, the certificate of business excellence.

Films
1988 - Super Xuxa Contra Baixo Astral (Super Xuxa Against the Bad Vibes)
1990 - Precipitação - short film
1990 - Lua de Cristal (Crystal Moon)
1990 - O Mistério de Robin Hood (The Mystery of Robin Hood)
1990 - Sonho de Verão (Summer Dream)
1991 - Inspetor Faustão e o Mallandro (Inspector Faustão and the Vagabond)
1991 - Gaúcho Negro (Black Gaucho)
1992 - Planeta Água - short film
1995 - O Mandarim (The Mandarin)
1999 - Xuxa Requebra
2000 - Xuxa Popstar
2001 - Nelson Gonçalves - docudrama
2001 - Xuxa e os Duendes (Xuxa and the Elves)
2002 - Zico - docudrama
2002 - Xuxa e os Duendes 2 - No Caminho das Fadas (Xuxa and the Elves 2)
2003 - Didi, o Cupido Trapalhão (Didi, the Goofy Cupid)
2003 - Dom
2003 - Maria - Mãe do Filho de Deus (Mary, Mother of the Son of God)
2003 - Xuxa Abracadabra (Xuxa in Abracadabra)
2004 - Um Show de Verão (Summer Show)
2004 - Didi Quer Ser Criança (Didi Wannabe a Kid)
2004 - Xuxa e o Tesouro da Cidade Perdida (Xuxa and the Lost Treasure's City)
2005 - Coisa de Mulher (Chick Thing)
2005 - Xuxinha e Guto contra os Monstros do Espaço (Xuxinha and Guto Against the Space Monsters) - animation
2005 - Didi, o Caçador de Tesouros (Didi, the Treasure Raider)
2006 - A Máquina (The Machine)
2006 - Trair e Coçar É Só Começar (Cheating in Chains)
2006 - Fica Comigo Esta Noite (Stay with Me Tonight)
2006 - Xuxa Gêmeas (Xuxa Twins)
2006 - O Cavaleiro Didi e a Princesa Lili (The Knight Didi and the Princess Lili)
2007 - Turma da Mônica em Uma Aventura no Tempo (Monica's Gang in an Adventure in Time) - animation
2008 - Juízo (Behave) - documentary
2008 - O Guerreiro Didi e a Ninja Lili (The Warrior Didi and the Ninja Lili)
2009 - Destino (Destiny) - post-production
2009 - Bonitinha Mas Ordinária (Pretty But Slutty) - post-production
2009 - Uma Professora Muito Maluquinha (An Extremely Nutty Teacher) - post-production
2011 - Uma Professora Muito Maluquinha - André Pinto e Cesar Rodrigues
2012 - Bonitinha, Mas Ordinária - Moacyr Góes
2013 - Meus dois Amores - Luiz Henrique Rios

References

Film production companies of Brazil
Companies based in Rio de Janeiro (city)
Mass media companies established in 2003